Callibia is a genus of praying mantis in the family Acanthopidae.  The genus contains only one species, Callibia diana.

See also
List of mantis genera and species

References

Acanthopidae
Mantodea of South America
Mantodea genera
Monotypic insect genera